Abdelhadi Said (born 1974 in Marrakech) is a Moroccan poet.

His first collection of poems has received the "prix de poésie de l'Union des Écrivains du Maroc" (poetry prize of the union of writers of Morocco) when he was 22 years old. In 2005 he wrote the novel "Barbus jusqu'aux dents".

Bibliography 
 Taphassil Assarab, UEM, 1996
 Infarctus ou les mots décroisés, L'Harmattan, 2002
 La Wa Akhawatoha, Saad Warzazi Editions, 2003
 Routine Addahcha, Saad Warzazi Editions, 2004
 Barbus jusqu'aux dents, Le Manuscrit, 2005

External links
 Interview with Abdelhadi (in French)
 Homepage of Abdelhadi Said (in Arabic)
 Poems by Abdelhadi (in Arabic)

1974 births
Living people
20th-century Moroccan poets
People from Marrakesh
21st-century Moroccan poets